Fred Stallard (1938/1939 – June 1991) was an English footballer who played as a goalkeeper for Derry City and for the Irish Football League in representative inter-league matches. He joined Derry City on 3 January 1959 while serving in the RAF stationed at their Ballykelly base. He represented the Irish League against the English Football League on 1 November 1961 at Windsor Park, Belfast, which finished as a 6–1 defeat, and remained as Derry City's first-choice goalkeeper until the end of the 1962–63 season when he returned to England.

References

Year of birth missing
1930s births
1991 deaths
English footballers
Association football goalkeepers
Derry City F.C. players
Stratford Town F.C. players